Calepina is a genus of flowering plants belonging to the family Brassicaceae.

Its native range is Europe, Mediterranean to Caucasus.

Species:

Calepina irregularis

References

Brassicaceae
Brassicaceae genera